William Conyngham Greene may refer to:

William Greene (priest) (1827–1910), Dean of Christ Church, Dublin
Sir Conyngham Greene (1854–1934), British diplomat and nephew of the dean